The 1836 United States presidential election in Maryland took place between November 3 and December 7, 1836, as part of the 1836 United States presidential election. Voters chose 10 representatives, or electors to the Electoral College, who voted for President and Vice President.

Maryland voted for Whig candidate William Henry Harrison over the Democratic candidate, Martin Van Buren. Harrison won Maryland by a margin of 7.46%.

Results

Results by county

See also
 United States presidential elections in Maryland
 1836 United States presidential election
 1836 United States elections

Notes

References 

Maryland
1836
Presidential